Lamar Advertising is an outdoor advertising company which operates billboards, logo signs, and transit displays in the United States and Canada. The company was founded in 1902 by Charles W. Lamar and J.M. Coe, and is headquartered in Baton Rouge, Louisiana. The company has over 200 locations in the United States and Canada. They have reportedly more than 325,000 displays across the USA. Lamar Advertising Company became a real estate investment trust in 2014.

History 
Lamar Advertising Company was founded in 1902 by J.M. Coe and Charles W. Lamar. The Company became independent under its current name in 1908 in Pensacola, Florida, when Charles W. Lamar, Sr. and J.M. Coe decided to dissolve their three-year partnership using a coin toss to divide their assets. The Pensacola Opera House and the Pensacola Advertising Company that was created to promote it were to be divided between the two men. Charles W. Lamar lost the toss and was left with the less-lucrative poster company, which he renamed the Lamar Outdoor Advertising Company.

The Pensacola Opera House was destroyed during Hurricane Four of the 1917 Atlantic hurricane season, with the Saenger Theatre later built on the site.

In 2004, Lamar acquired Obie Media Corporation of Eugene, Oregon, adding 250 faces to its Washington and Idaho regions.

In January 2016, Lamar purchased advertising rights in five major American markets from Clear Channel Outdoor for $458.5 million.

References

External links

Advertising agencies of the United States
Financial services companies established in 1902
Marketing companies established in 1902
Real estate companies established in 1902
Companies based in Baton Rouge, Louisiana
Companies listed on the Nasdaq
Outdoor advertising agencies
Real estate investment trusts of the United States